Lone Nasir (born 5 September 1997) is an Indian cricketer. He made his List A debut on 21 February 2021, for Jammu & Kashmir in the 2020–21 Vijay Hazare Trophy.

References

External links
 

1997 births
Living people
Indian cricketers
Jammu and Kashmir cricketers
Place of birth missing (living people)